Raymond Bates (8 February 1890 – 15 August 1970) was a Major League Baseball third baseman who played for two seasons. He played for the Cleveland Naps in 1913 and the Philadelphia Athletics in 1917.

Minor Leagues

Bates made his professional debut with Altoona, a Class B level team in the Tri-State League, in 1911.  During his career he also played with Newport News, a Class C team in the Virginia League, in 1912; Cleveland, a AA team in the American Association, in 1914; Portland, a Class AA team in the Pacific Coast League, in 1915; Vernon, a Class AA team in the Pacific Coast League, in 1916;  Los Angeles, a Class AA team in the Pacific Coast League, in 1919;  Seattle, a Class AA team in the Pacific Coast League, in 1921; Oklahoma City and Omaha, both Class A teams of the Western League, in 1922; and finished his career with Reading, a Class AA team of the International League, in 1923.  Bates had his best hitting season in 1921 hitting .338.

Major Leagues

Bates played in 27 games for the Cleveland Naps during the 1914 season hitting .167 with two triples, four RBI's, and three stolen bases.  He would return to the major leagues in a more regular role with the Philadelphia Athletics in 1917, playing in 127 games hitting .237 with two home runs, twenty doubles, seven triples, sixty-six RBI's, and twelve stolen bases.

Post Playing Career

In 1926 Bates was one of three managers of the Ogden Gunners, a Class C Utah-Idaho League.

References

External links

1890 births
1970 deaths
Cleveland Naps players
Philadelphia Athletics players
Minor league baseball managers
Altoona Rams players
Newport News Shipbuilders players
Cleveland Bearcats players
Portland Beavers players
Vernon Tigers players
Los Angeles Angels (minor league) players
Seattle Rainiers players
Oklahoma City Indians players
Omaha Buffaloes players
Reading Keystones players